The Wortham Gymnasium was a historic athletic facility on Arkansas Highway 200 in Oak Grove, a rural community in Nevada County east of Rosston.  Built in 1935 by a Works Progress Administration crew, this large gymnasium was the only surviving remnant of a major push in the 1920s and 1930s to improve the education of African Americans in Oak Grove.  It was a single-story wood-frame structure with a gable roof, with a shed-roofed vestibule area on the main (southern) facade.  At the time of its construction, it was the largest gymnasium in the state.

The building was listed on the National Register of Historic Places in 1990.  It was removed from the National Register in 2015.

See also
National Register of Historic Places listings in Nevada County, Arkansas

References

Sports venues on the National Register of Historic Places in Arkansas
Sports venues completed in 1935
1935 establishments in Arkansas
National Register of Historic Places in Nevada County, Arkansas
Works Progress Administration in Arkansas
Former buildings and structures in Arkansas
African-American history of Arkansas
Gyms in the United States
Bungalow architecture in Arkansas
American Craftsman architecture in Arkansas